Dean Hurley is an American composer, sound designer, and re-recording mixer. He has been nominated for a Primetime Emmy Award two times for the series, Twin Peaks (season 3). He is best known for his frequent collaborations with director David Lynch.

In 2017, Hurley released the album, Anthology Resource Vol. 1, which featured original material created for Twin Peaks and in 2019, Anthology Resource Vol. II: Philosophy of Beyond, on Sacred Bones Records.

Select filmography

Awards and nominations

Discography
Solo Albums
 Concrete Feather, Boomkat Editions (2020)
 Anthology Resource Vol. II, Sacred Bones Records (2019)
 Anthology Resource Vol. 1, Sacred Bones Records (2017)

Collaborative albums

 The Flame of Love (with David Lynch and Jack Cruz), Sacred Bones Records (2020)
 Twin Peaks (Limited Series Original Soundtrack) (with David Lynch), Rhino Records (2017)
 Somewhere in the Nowhere (with David Lynch and Chrysta Bell), Meta Hari (2016)
 The Big Dream (with David Lynch), Sunday Best Recordings (2013)
 This Train (with David Lynch and Chrysta Bell), La Rose Noire (2011)
 Crazy Clown Time (with David Lynch), Sunday Best Recordings (2010)
 The Air is on Fire (with David Lynch), DLMC (2007)
 Inland Empire (Original Soundtrack) (with David Lynch), DLMC (2007)

References

External links
 

Living people
American male composers
American composers
American sound designers
American sound editors
Year of birth missing (living people)